Arkady Nikolayevich Yermakov ( – 25 October 1957) was a Soviet Army lieutenant general.

Yermakov served as a Red Army commander during the Winter War and World War II. He served as the Senior Military Adviser to the Chinese People's Liberation Army during the Cold War.

Early life and career

Winter War
During the Finnish Winter War, then Kombrig Yermakov commanded the Soviet 100th Rifle Division which was involved in the breakthrough of the Mannerheim Line which brought about the end of the war. He authored a report about the performance of Soviet Teletanks in that campaign.

World War II

Early War

Battle of Moscow and the Yermakov Operational Group
During the Battle of Moscow, General Yermakov came to command what was known as the Yermakov Operational Group which grouped the 3rd Army, 13th Army, and 50th Army under his operational control in the Bryansk Front fighting against German Army Group Center. Ermakov's command was controversial for his focus on offensive operations from mid August to late September 1941. Marshal Yeryomenko credited his command's actions for significantly weakening the strength of the German Attack Groupings. Conversely, General Sanalov criticized him for paying insufficient attention to the defense during this time, leading to later losses.

Arrest, Court Martial, and Reinstatement
On January 29, 1942, while commander of the 50th Army, General Ermakov was arrested and court-martialed. He was later released, reinstated appointed Deputy Commander of the 20th Army later that year in June. He was to become commander of the 20th Army on March 20, 1943.

Post-war service
He was Senior Military Adviser to the Chinese People's Liberation Army between 1953 and 1957, and died shortly after serving in that position.

Awards

Soviet orders and medals

Foreign awards

Notes

References

Citations

Bibliography

1899 births
1957 deaths
Communist Party of the Soviet Union members
Soviet military personnel of World War II
Soviet lieutenant generals
Soviet military personnel of the Winter War
Soviet military personnel of the Russian Civil War
People from Mtsensk
Recipients of the Order of Lenin
Recipients of the Order of the Red Banner
Recipients of the Order of Kutuzov, 2nd class
Military Academy of the General Staff of the Armed Forces of the Soviet Union alumni
People nominated for the title Hero of the Soviet Union